<noinclude>

Enosis Neon Paralimni B.C. (in Greek: Ένωσις Νέων Παραλιμνίου), is a Cypriot professional basketball club based in Paralimni, Cyprus. The club competes in the Cypriot League.

History
The club was founded in 1936.

Players

Current roster

Notable players

Anthony Hickey (born 1992), basketball player for Hapoel Haifa in the Israeli Basketball Premier League
Michale Kyser (born 1991), basketball player for Hapoel Holon in the Israeli Basketball Premier League

Sources
Official website

Basketball teams in Cyprus
Enosis Neon Paralimni